Broughton Hall High School is an all-girls', Roman Catholic secondary school and sixth form located in the West Derby area of Liverpool, L12 9HJ  England.

History 
Broughton Hall was built in 1860 for Gustavus C. Schaube of Hamburg, a prominent Liverpool merchant and the conservatory was added between 1870 and 1880. Broughton Hall High School was founded in 1928 under the Trusteeship of the Sisters of Mercy. It was previously known as Convent of Mercy Girls' High School.

Broughton Hall Convent  
The Broughton Hall Convent is a 19th-century grade II* listed building.

The Sisters of Mercy purchased Broughton Hall in 1925, a former grand mansion in West Derby, as the site for a large school set in extensive grounds. As the school was developed in future years, teaching at the convent became less frequent until teaching was moved completely to the new school buildings. The convent is still home to the Sisters of Mercy.

Alumni
 Irene Desmet, paediatric surgeon
 Jennifer Ellison, actress who played Emily Shadwick in Brookside
 Natasha Hamilton of Atomic Kitten
 Gail McKenna, former Page 3 model, (8 O levels)
 Angela Topping (née Lightfoot) poet, author and critic
 Bianca Walkden, female GB taekwondo player

References

External links
School website

Catholic secondary schools in the Archdiocese of Liverpool
Educational institutions established in 1928
Girls' schools in Merseyside
Secondary schools in Liverpool
1928 establishments in England
Sisters of Mercy schools
Voluntary aided schools in England